Selma is an unincorporated community and census-designated place (CDP) in Josephine County, Oregon, United States. As of the 2010 census it had a population of 695. It is located in the ZIP code of 97538.

Geography
Selma is just southwest of the center of Josephine County, in the valley of Deer Creek, a west-flowing tributary of the Illinois River and part of the Rogue River watershed. U.S. Route 199 passes through the center of town, leading south  to Cave Junction and northeast  to Grants Pass, the county seat.

Demographics

Notable residents
Actor John Wayne used to visit the Deer Creek Ranch one mile west of Selma; it is now the Deer Creek Center for Field Research and Education. He grew fond of the area after filming Rooster Cogburn along the Rogue River. Also from Selma is Kristy Lee Cook, who came in 7th place on American Idol season 7.

References

Unincorporated communities in Josephine County, Oregon
Census-designated places in Oregon
Census-designated places in Josephine County, Oregon
Unincorporated communities in Oregon